"The Duplicity of Hargraves" is a short story by the American writer William Sydney Porter, better known by his pen name: O. Henry.  The story was featured in The Junior Munsey, February 1902, and republished in the volume Sixes and Sevens (1911).

Summary
Sixty-eight-year-old Major Pendleton Talbot and his practical spinster daughter Lydia move to Washington D.C.  The Talbots have fallen from their aristocratic past in the South before the American Civil War and are now quite poor. The pair stay at a boarding house in the nation's capital. There they become acquainted with Henry Hopkins Hargraves, an ambitious actor in vaudeville. Hargraves is seemingly spellbound by the Major's tales of his happier past (of which he is writing a book).

Eventually, the Talbots fall behind on their rent. The Major seeks the help of their congressman in getting his book published, but to little avail. The impractical Major spends their last two dollars on play tickets. Lydia is dismayed, but seeing as the money has been spent, goes to see the play with her father. They are shocked to see Hargraves impersonating her father on stage. When Hargraves comes to see the Major to offer him financial help, the Major informs him that he saw the actor's performance and is highly offended. He refuses to accept any money, even though he and Lydia are almost destitute.

Just when the father and daughter's situation is most bleak, "an old colored man" appears and tells the Talbots that he was once one of Talbot's slaves. He has prospered and wants to repay an old family debt. Major Talbot accepts the payment.  Later Lydia received a letter from Hargraves, explaining that he played the ex-slave. She hides the letter from her father.

Film adaptation
"The Duplicity of Hargraves" was adapted to film by Broadway Star Features Co. in 1917 and directed by Thomas R. Mills. The cast was:
 Charles Kent as Major Pendleton
 J. Frank Glendon as Henry Hopkins Hargraves
 Myrtis Coney as Miss Lydia 
 Mrs. Fisher as Mrs. Vardeman 
 William Courtney as Scen

External links
 Included in The Best American Humorous Short Stories by H. C. Bunner et al
 

1902 short stories
Short stories by O. Henry
Short stories adapted into films